Dustin Schneider  (born 27 February 1985) is a Canadian retired professional volleyball player. He was the setter for the Canada men's national volleyball team for 9 years, helping the team win medals at the NORCECA Championship three separate times, as well as a bronze medal at the 2015 Pan American Games.

Career

Club
Dustin began his post-secondary volleyball career with the University of Winnipeg Wesmen in 2004. He would go on to lead the team to a CIS championship in 2007, being named MVP along the way. In 2009, he began his professional career with Austrian club VCA Niederösterreic, before going on to play for several different European clubs throughout his career.

National Team
Dustin joined the national team program in 2007. He helped the team win bronze, silver, and gold at the NORCECA Championship in 2011, 2013, and 2015 respectively, as well as a bronze medal at the 2009 Men's Pan-American Volleyball Cup and 2015 Pan American Games. He announced his retirement from volleyball in 2016.

Sporting achievements

Clubs

National championships
 2006/2007  CIS Championship, with Winnipeg Wesmen
 2007/2008  CIS Championship, with Winnipeg Wesmen
 2010/2011  Portuguese Volleyball First Division, with S.L. Benfica
 2011/2012  French Ligue B, with Chaumont VB 52
 2013/2014  Polish Men's Volleyball Cup, with ZAKSA

National team
 2009  Pan American Cup
 2011  NORCECA Championship
 2013  NORCECA Championship
 2015  Pan American Games
 2015  NORCECA Championship

References

1985 births
Living people
Canadian men's volleyball players
Pan American Games bronze medalists for Canada
Pan American Games medalists in volleyball
Sportspeople from Brandon, Manitoba
Volleyball players at the 2015 Pan American Games
ZAKSA Kędzierzyn-Koźle players
Medalists at the 2015 Pan American Games